International Society of Skin Pharmacology and Physiology (ISP) is an international organization founded in Basel in 2003 to provide an interdisciplinary forum for discussion and presentation of advances in skin-related topics. The president is Jürgen Lademann. Its official journal is Skin Pharmacology and Physiology.

References

External links
 

International medical associations
Organizations established in 2003